Stephen Coleman Figueroa (born June 30, 1987) is an American former Major League Baseball (MLB) infielder who played for the Tampa Bay Rays, New York Yankees and Pittsburgh Pirates between 2014 and 2016. He currently works in the Tampa Bay Rays front office as the Director of Baseball Operations.

Amateur career
Figueroa attended Lincoln High School in Tallahassee, Florida, where he helped take the school's baseball team to the District 4A Championship. Figueroa played college baseball at the University of Florida while majoring in Sports Management. Figueroa's college achievements included All-Southeastern Conference (SEC) Freshman Team the SEC all-academic team. Figueroa was also named freshman All-American by rivals.com, Louisville Slugger, and Baseball America. He was selected to the Dick Howser Trophy watch list.

In 2008, Figueroa was named to the All-SEC academic team. He was named a Golden Spikes Award finalist along with being named to the midseason watch list for the Brooks Wallace Award. Figueroa led the Gators that year in average, home runs, RBI, Slugging percentage and on-base percentage. 

In 2007, he played collegiate summer baseball with the Harwich Mariners of the Cape Cod Baseball League (CCBL), and was named a league all-star. He returned to the CCBL in 2008 to play for the Orleans Cardinals.

Professional career

Tampa Bay Rays
Figueroa was drafted in the 6th round in the 2008 MLB Draft by the San Diego Padres. Figueroa received an over slot $400,000 signing bonus when he signed a contract with the Padres on July 5, 2008.

The Padres traded Figueroa to the Tampa Bay Rays along with Brandon Gomes, Cesar Ramos, and Adam Russell in exchange for Jason Bartlett on December 17, 2010. The Rays called up Figueroa to the major leagues on May 15, 2014 and he made his MLB debut two days later.

New York Yankees
Figueroa signed with the New York Yankees organization on a minor league contract in December 2014. He began the season with the Scranton/Wilkes-Barre RailRiders of the Class AAA International League. The Yankees promoted Figueroa to the major leagues on July 9. He elected free agency on November 6, 2015.

Pittsburgh Pirates
On December 8, 2015, Figueroa signed a minor league contract with the Pittsburgh Pirates. On April 2, 2016, it was announced that Figueroa would make the Pirates Opening Day roster as a reserve infielder, beating out offseason acquisition Jason Rogers and incumbent Pedro Florimón for the job. He hit .260/.321/.340 in 57 plate appearances in spring training.

Figueroa made his Pirates debut on April 8, 2016, fouling out to third base in a pinch hit appearance. On June 24, he was designated for assignment.

Los Angeles Dodgers
On June 28, 2016, he was claimed off waivers by the Los Angeles Dodgers and optioned to the AAA Oklahoma City Dodgers. He was designated for assignment by the Dodgers on July 8, and elected free agency over an outright assignment on July 11.

Post-playing career
On December 16, 2021, the Tampa Bay Rays announced that Figueroa had been promoted to serve as the team's director of baseball operations.

Personal life
Figueroa is the son of Cindy and Bien Figueroa. His father played in the major leagues for the St. Louis Cardinals.

See also
List of second-generation Major League Baseball players

References

External links

1987 births
Living people
Baseball players from Tallahassee, Florida
Major League Baseball second basemen
Tampa Bay Rays players
New York Yankees players
Pittsburgh Pirates players
Florida Gators baseball players
Orleans Firebirds players
Harwich Mariners players
Eugene Emeralds players
Fort Wayne TinCaps players
Lake Elsinore Storm players
Montgomery Biscuits players
Durham Bulls players
Scranton/Wilkes-Barre RailRiders players
Peoria Saguaros players
Leones del Escogido players
American expatriate baseball players in the Dominican Republic
Indianapolis Indians players
Oklahoma City Dodgers players